Jundiaí River may refer to:

 Jundiaí River (Espírito Santo)
 Jundiaí River (upper Tietê River tributary)
 Jundiaí River (Rio Grande do Norte)
 Jundiaí River (São Paulo)

See also 
 Jundiaí